The Jeffrey Manufacturing Company was one of the largest industrial plants in Columbus, Ohio during the Second Industrial Revolution. It belonged to the original cluster of factories which were set up in the Milo-Grogan area of the city, including manufacturer Kilbourne and Jacobs. During this period, Ohio's economy transformed from agricultural to industrial, making the state one of the largest coal-producing and consuming states in the US. Manufacturers in the region stimulated the transformation by producing high volumes of railroad and mining equipment and farming machinery. According to the COSI Center of Science and Industry, the Jeffrey Manufacturing Company played a significant role in the success of the coal mine.   

The Jeffrey Manufacturing Co. began as the Lechner Mining Machine Company in 1877, and was purchased by Joseph Andrews Jeffrey in 1888. The company's primary market was the coal mine industry, and it began business on a four-acre site. By the late 1940s, the site had grown to 48-acres, including 40 buildings. Also in 1888, the company became the first American locomotive manufacturer to build an electric locomotive for underground coal mines. It then developed and manufactured a coal crusher, and later conveyors for effective transport of coal through mines.    

Jeffrey Manufacturing was non-union until 1953. However, founder Joseph A. Jeffrey founded one of the first industrial infirmaries in the nation in 1889, as well as established a cooperative store, an employee cafeteria, and a program which assisted employees in buying homes.

As the company grew, it acquired a number of other companies in the area, including the Ohio Malleable Iron Company in 1904, the Diamond Coal Cutter Company in 1926, and Galion Iron Works in 1942.

References 

Companies based in Ohio
Defunct companies based in Columbus, Ohio
Defunct manufacturing companies based in Ohio